Edith Louisa Niederer (1890–1973) was a New Zealand farmer and community leader.

References

1890 births
1973 deaths
New Zealand farmers
New Zealand women farmers